SS Alexander E. Brown was a Liberty ship built in the United States during World War II. She was named after Alexander E. Brown.

Construction 
Alexander E. Brown was laid down on 18 August 1944, under a Maritime Commission (MARCOM) contract, MC hull 2321, by J.A. Jones Construction, Panama City, Florida; sponsored by Mrs. Robert Jones Sister, sister-in-law of Raymond A. Jones, vice president and general manager, JAJCC, and launched on 28 September 1944.

History
She was allocated to South Atlantic Steamship Lines Inc., 13 October 1944. On 5 June 1946, she was laid up in the n James River Reserve Fleet, Lee Hall, Virginia, 5 June 1946.

She was sold, on 23 December 1946, to Nicholas Eustathiou, for $565,691.07 and commercial use. She was flagged in Greece and renamed Michalakis. She was withdrawn from the fleet on 27 December 1946.

References

Bibliography 

 
 
 
 

 

Liberty ships
Ships built in Panama City, Florida
1944 ships
James River Reserve Fleet